Karen Brahes Folio (Odense, Landsarkivet for Fyn, Karen Brahe E I,1, also known as Karen Brahes Foliohåndskrift) is a manuscript collection of Danish ballads dating from c. 1583. The manuscript contains the following names, presumed to be of its owners: E Mett Lange, Knud Brahe 1583; Ellen Giøe, Otto Giøe, Torpegaard 17 September 1628. The manuscript's modern name relates to its later owner, the Danish noblewoman and book-collector Karen Brahe (1657-1736).

With around two hundred ballads, the manuscript is one of the largest early collections of Danish folksongs (and indeed Scandinavian folk-songs generally), offering some of the earliest texts of ballads like Elveskud, Herr Bøsmer i elvehjem, and Harpens kraft. Around the time of its creation, or shortly after, it seems to have belonged to the noblewoman Margrethe Lange, who came from Engelsholm at Vejle. This is consistent with the heavy influence in the texts from the Jutlandic dialect. The manuscript is held today in the regional archive of Fyn.

Svend Grundtvig characterized the manuscript as "the richest and in every way most significant folk song manuscript that any country has to offer", while noting that it has a consistent tendency of embellishment of its traditional material.

Sources 

 'Karen Brahes Folio', Den store danske: Gyldendals åbne encyclopædi, http://www.denstoredanske.dk/Livsstil,_sport_og_fritid/Folketro_og_folkemindevidenskab/Karen_Brahes_Folio, accessed 11 July 2013.
 http://duds.nordisk.ku.dk/tekstresurser/aeldste_danske_viseoverlevering/viseboegerne/karen_brahes_folio_aeldre/
 http://www.karenbrahe.dk/

References

See also 

 Danmarks gamle Folkeviser
 The Types of the Scandinavian Medieval Ballad

Ballad collections
Danish folk music